The Gorontalo language (also called Hulontalo) is a language spoken in Gorontalo Province, Sulawesi, Indonesia by the Gorontalo people.

Considerable lexical influence comes from Malay, Arabic, Portuguese, Dutch, and the North Halmahera languages. Manado Malay and Indonesian are also spoken in the area.

Dialects
Musa Kasim et al. (1981) give five main dialects of Gorontalo: east Gorontalo, Limboto, Gorontolo City, west Gorontalo, and Tilamuta.

Phonology

Consonants 

Consonant sequences include NC (homorganic nasal–plosive), where C may be . Elsewhere,  are relatively rare and only occur before high vowels. , written  in the literature, is a laminal post-alveoral coronal stop that is indeterminate as to voicing.

Vowels 
Gorontalo has five vowels.

Notes

References 

 
 
 
 
 

Gorontalo–Mongondow languages
Languages of Sulawesi